Daniel Harvey Hill (July 12, 1821 – September 24, 1889), commonly known as D. H. Hill, was a Confederate general who commanded infantry in the eastern and western theaters of the American Civil War.

Hill was known as an aggressive leader, being severely strict, deeply religious, and having dry, sarcastic humor. He was brother-in-law to Stonewall Jackson and a close friend to both James Longstreet and Joseph E. Johnston, but disagreements with both Robert E. Lee and Braxton Bragg cost him favor with Confederate President Jefferson Davis. Although his military ability was well respected, Hill was underutilized by the end of the American Civil War because of these political feuds.

Early life and education
Daniel Harvey Hill was born at Hill's Iron Works in York District, South Carolina to Solomon and Nancy Cabeen Hill. His paternal grandfather, William "Billy" Hill, was a native of Ireland who had an iron foundry in York District where he made cannons for the Continental Army. His maternal grandfather was a native of Scotland.

Hill graduated from the United States Military Academy in 1842, ranking 28 out of 56 cadets, and was appointed to the 1st United States Artillery as a brevet 2nd Lieutenant. He was transferred to the 3rd Artillery on October 20, 1843. Hill was promoted to 2nd Lt. On October 13, 1845, in the 4th Artillery Regt. He was promoted to 1st Lt on March 3, 1847. As his regiment served as infantry, he distinguished himself in the Mexican–American War, being brevetted to captain for bravery at the Battle of Contreras and Battle of Churubusco, and brevetted to major for bravery at the Battle of Chapultepec. Among the people enslaved by the Hill family during Daniel Harvey's youth was Elias Hill. Daniel Harvey helped teach him to read and write. As a freedman after the war, Hill became a preacher and led his congregation in emigrating to Liberia after the Ku Klux Klan terrorized his neighborhood.

In February 1849, Daniel Harvey Hill resigned his commission and became a professor of mathematics at Washington College (now Washington and Lee University), in Lexington, Virginia. While living in Lexington, he wrote a college textbook for the Southern United States market, Elements of Algebra, which "with quiet, sardonic humor, points a finger of ridicule or scorn at any and everything Northern." While not all of the textbook's questions were "anti-Yankee", many were, such as:

By contrast, "Southerners in his problems invariably appear in a favorable light."

In 1854, he joined the faculty of Davidson College, North Carolina. In 1859, he was appointed as superintendent of the North Carolina Military Institute of Charlotte.

American Civil War
At the outbreak of the American Civil War, D. H. Hill became a colonel of the 1st North Carolina Infantry Regiment, the "Bethel Regiment", at the head of which he won the Battle of Big Bethel, near Fort Monroe, Virginia, on June 10, 1861. Shortly after this, on July 10, 1861, he was promoted to brigadier general and commanded troops in the Richmond area. By the spring of 1862, he was a major general and division commander in the Army of Northern Virginia. He participated in the Yorktown and Williamsburg operations that started the Peninsula Campaign in the spring of 1862, and as a major general, led a division with great distinction in the Battle of Seven Pines and the Seven Days Battles. Hill's division was left in the Richmond area while the rest of the army went north and did not participate in the Northern Virginia Campaign.

On July 22, 1862, Hill and U.S. Maj. Gen. John Adams Dix agreed in the general exchange of prisoners between the United States and Confederate armies, known as the Dix-Hill Cartel. This established a scale of equivalents, where an officer would be exchanged for a fixed number of enlisted men, and also allowed for the parole of prisoners, who would undertake not to serve in a military capacity until officially exchanged. (The cartel worked well for a few months but broke down when Confederates insisted on treating black prisoners of war as fugitive slaves and returning them to their previous owners.)

In the Maryland Campaign of 1862, Hill's men fought at the Battle of South Mountain. Scattered as far north as Boonsboro, Maryland when the fighting began, the division fought tooth and nail, buying Lee's army enough time to concentrate at nearby Sharpsburg. Hill's division saw fierce action in the infamous sunken road ("Bloody Lane") at the Battle of Antietam, and he rallied a few detached men from different brigades to hold the line at the critical moment. The Confederate defeat was largely due to the interception by McClellan of Special Order 191 from Lee to his generals, revealing the movements of his widely separated divisions. Some have claimed that D. H. Hill received two copies of this order, of which one went astray. But Hill said he received only one copy.

Hill's division was largely unengaged at the Battle of Fredericksburg. At this point, conflicts with Lee began to surface. Hill was not appointed to a corps command on the reorganization of the Army of Northern Virginia after Stonewall Jackson's death. He had already been detached from Lee's Army and sent to his home state to recruit troops. He led Confederate reserve troops protecting Richmond during the Gettysburg Campaign. In late June, he successfully resisted a half-hearted advance by U.S. forces under John Adams Dix and Erasmus Keyes.

In 1863, he was sent to Gen. Braxton Bragg's newly reorganized Army of Tennessee, with a promotion to lieutenant general, to command one of its corps. Hill had served under Bragg in Mexico and was initially pleased to be reunited with an old friend, but the warm feelings did not last long. Hill's forces saw some of the heaviest fighting in the bloody and confused Battle of Chickamauga. Afterward, Hill joined several other generals openly condemning Bragg's failure to exploit the victory. President of the Confederate States Jefferson Davis personally came to resolve this dispute in Bragg's favor and to the detriment of those unhappy generals. The Army of Tennessee was reorganized again, and Hill was left without a command. Davis then refused to forward Hill's appointment to the Confederate Senate, and he reverted to major general. Because of this, Hill saw less fighting throughout the remainder of the war.

After that, D. H. Hill commanded as a volunteer in smaller actions away from the major armies. Hill participated in the Battle of Bentonville in North Carolina, the last fight of the Army of Tennessee. Hill was a division commander when he, along with Gen. Joseph E. Johnston, surrendered on April 26, 1865.

Later life
From 1866 to 1869, Hill edited a magazine, The Land We Love, at Charlotte, North Carolina, which dealt with social and historical subjects and had a great influence in the former slave states. In 1877, he became one of the first presidents of the University of Arkansas, a post that he held until 1884, and, in 1885, president of the Military and Agricultural College of Milledgeville, Georgia until August 1889, when he resigned due to failing health. General Hill died at Charlotte the following month and was buried in Davidson College Cemetery.

Personal life
On November 2, 1848, he married Isabella Morrison, who was the daughter of Robert Hall Morrison, a Presbyterian minister and the first president of Davidson College, and through her mother, a niece of North Carolina Governor William Alexander Graham. They would have nine children in all. One son, Daniel Harvey Hill Jr., would serve as president of North Carolina State College (now North Carolina State University). Their youngest son, Joseph Morrison, would preside as the Chief Justice of the Arkansas Supreme Court from 1904 to 1909.

In July 1857, Isabella's younger sister, Mary Anna, married Professor Thomas J. Jackson of the Virginia Military Institute. Hill and Jackson, who would later earn the nickname "Stonewall" as a Confederate officer, had crossed paths during the Mexican–American War and later developed a closer friendship when both men lived in Lexington, Virginia in the 1850s. Also in 1857, Jackson endorsed Elements of Algebra as "superior to any other work with which I am acquainted on the same branch of science."

Selected works
 College Discipline: An Inaugural Address Delivered at Davidson College, N.C., on February 28, 1855. [n. p.: n. p.], 1855. 19 p.; 23 cm.   OCLC 7195350
 Elements of Algebra. Philadelphia, PA: J.B. Lippincott, [1857], 1859. xii, [13]-507 p. tables 22 cm.  OCLC 19591232  Elements of Algebra by Maj. D. H. Hill.  Google Books pdf of the complete 1857 edition.
 A Consideration of the Sermon on the Mount. Philadelphia, PA: W. S. & A. Martien, 1858, 1859. 3 p.l., [5]-282 p. 19 cm.  OCLC 7195011 e-Book version Ann Arbor, Mich.: Making of America, 2000. OCLC 612157953
 The Crucifixion of Christ. Philadelphia, PA: W.S. & A. Martien, 1859. 345 p. 20 cm. OCLC 4392161
 Remarks of Major D. H. Hill of the N.C. Military Institute at Charlotte, before the Committee on Education of the North Carolina Legislature. [North Carolina: n. p., 1860?]. 1 sheet ([1] p.) ; 49 x 30 cm. OCLC 41374540
 Gen. Hill founded and edited The Land We Love: A Monthly Magazine Devoted to Literature, Military History, and Agriculture. 6 vols. Charlotte, NC: J.P. Irwin & D.H. Hill, 1866-1869. Sabin No. 38821. This magazine merged with The New Eclectic Magazine of Baltimore, MD. Subsequently, it was called The Southern Magazine. OCLC 752793193 OCLC Record Containing Contents List for Issues of The Land We Love.
 The Old South: An Address Delivered by Lieutenant-General D.H. Hill, at Ford's Grand Opera House, on Memorial Day, June 6, 1887, before the Society of the Army and Navy of the Confederate States in the State of Maryland. Baltimore, MD: Andrew J. Conlon, 1887. 23 p. ; 23 cm. OCLC 5315299

See also
 List of Confederate States Army generals

References

Further reading

 Bridges, Hal. Lee's Maverick General: Daniel Harvey Hill. Lincoln: University of Nebraska Press, 1991. . First published in 1961 by McGraw-Hill.
 Eicher, John H., and David J. Eicher, Civil War High Commands. Stanford: Stanford University Press, 2001. .
 Evans, Clement A., ed. Confederate Military History: A Library of Confederate States History. 12 vols. Atlanta: Confederate Publishing Company, 1899. .
 Hawkins, Vincent B. "Daniel Harvey Hill." In Harper Encyclopedia of Military Biography, edited by Trevor N. Dupuy, Curt Johnson, and David L. Bongard. New York: HarperCollins, 1992. .
 Johnson, Robert Underwood, and Clarence C. Buel, eds. Battles and Leaders of the Civil War. 4 vols. New York: Century Co., 1884-1888. .
 Owen, Richard, and James Owen. Generals at Rest: The Grave Sites of the 425 Official Confederate Generals. Shippensburg, PA: White Mane Publishing Co., 1997. .
 Sifakis, Stewart. Who Was Who in the Civil War. New York: Facts On File, 1988. .
 U.S. War Department. The War of the Rebellion: a Compilation of the Official Records of the Union and Confederate Armies. Washington, DC: U.S. Government Printing Office, 1880–1901.
 Online biography of Hill
 Warner, Ezra J. Generals in Gray: Lives of the Confederate Commanders. Baton Rouge: Louisiana State University Press, 1959. .

External links

 
 Daniel Harvey Hill by Don L. Morrill, Charlotte-Mecklenburg Historic Landmarks Commission website
 Daniel Harvey Hill: The Pre-Civil War Years by Dr. Don L. Morrill, Charlotte-Mecklenburg Historic Landmarks Commission website
 Isabella Morrison Hill, Wife Of Confederate General Daniel Harvey Hill
 North Carolina History Project: Daniel Harvey Hill (1821-1889) by Troy L. Kickler.

1821 births
1889 deaths
19th-century American writers
19th-century Presbyterians
American Calvinist and Reformed Christians
American military personnel of the Mexican–American War
American people of Irish descent
American people of Scotch-Irish descent
American Presbyterians
American proslavery activists
American religious writers
Confederate States Army lieutenant generals
Daniel Hill family
Davidson College faculty
Leaders of the University of Arkansas
People from Mecklenburg County, North Carolina
People from Milledgeville, Georgia
People from York County, South Carolina
People of North Carolina in the American Civil War
Southern Historical Society
United States Military Academy alumni
Washington and Lee University people